The high-definition optical disc format war was a market competition between the Blu-ray and HD DVD optical disc standards for storing high-definition video and audio; it took place between 2006 and 2008 and was won by Blu-ray Disc.

The two formats emerged between 2000 and 2005 and attracted both the mutual and exclusive support of major consumer electronics manufacturers, personal computer manufacturers, television and movie producers and distributors, and software developers.

Blu-ray and HD DVD players became commercially available starting in 2006.  In early 2008, the war ended when several studios and distributors shifted to Blu-ray disc. On February 19, 2008, Toshiba officially announced that it would stop the development of the HD DVD players, conceding the format war to the Blu-ray Disc format.

Background
The Blu-ray/HD DVD conflict resembled the earlier videotape format war between VHS and Betamax, partly because  of Sony's strong involvement in both episodes. These format wars have often proved destructive to both camps because consumers, afraid of committing to a losing standard, would refrain from purchasing either. Format wars have been avoided in notable cases such as the DVD Forum for the unified DVD standard (except for a minor war from 1998 to 1999 with the DIVX format), the Grand Alliance for the HDTV standard, and the Wi-Fi Alliance for wireless networking standards.

The emergence of high definition players followed the entry of HDTV televisions into the mainstream market in the mid-2000s. Consumer-grade high definition players required an inexpensive storage medium capable of holding the larger amount of data needed for HD video. The breakthrough came with Shuji Nakamura's invention of the blue laser diode, whose shorter wavelength opened the door to higher density optical media following a six-year patent dispute.

Sony started two projects applying the new diodes: Ultra Density Optical and, with Pioneer, DVR Blue. The first DVR Blue prototypes were unveiled at the CEATEC exhibition in October 2000. On February 19, 2002, the project was officially announced as Blu-ray, and the Blu-ray Disc Association was founded by a consortium of nine electronics companies.

The DVD Forum, chaired by Toshiba, was deeply split over whether to go with the more expensive blue lasers, whose discs initially required a protective caddy to avoid mishandling, making the medium more expensive and physically different from DVDs. In March 2002, the forum voted to approve a proposal endorsed by Warner Bros. and other motion picture studios that involved compressing HD content onto dual-layer DVD-9 discs. In spite of this decision, the DVD Forum's Steering Committee announced in April 2002 that it was pursuing its own blue-laser high-definition solution. In August, Toshiba and NEC announced their competing standard Advanced Optical Disc, which was finally adopted by the DVD Forum and renamed "HD DVD" the following year after being voted down twice by Blu-ray Disc Association members, prompting the U.S. Department of Justice to make preliminary investigations. Three new members had to be invited and the voting rules changed before the initiative finally passed.

The competing standards had significant differences that made each incompatible with the other.

Attempts to avoid a format war
In an attempt to avoid a costly format war, the Blu-ray Disc Association and DVD Forum started to negotiate a compromise in early 2005. One of the issues was that Blu-ray's supporters wanted to use a Java-based platform for interactivity (BD-J), while the DVD Forum was promoting Microsoft's "iHD" (which became HDi). A much larger issue, though, was the physical formats of the discs themselves; the Blu-ray Disc Association's member companies did not want to risk losing billions of dollars in royalties as they had done with standard DVD. An agreement seemed close, but negotiations proceeded slowly.

At the end of June 2005, Sun Microsystems, the developer of Java, announced that the Blu-ray Association had chosen the Java-based BD-J interactivity layer instead of Microsoft's HDi. At the same time, Microsoft and Toshiba jointly announced that they would cooperate in developing high-definition DVD players. In a top-level meeting in July, Microsoft's Bill Gates argued that the Blu-ray standard had to change to "work more smoothly with personal computers".  The Blu-ray Disc's representatives defended the technology.

On August 22, 2005, the Blu-ray Disc Association and DVD Forum announced that the negotiations to unify their standards had failed. Rumors surfaced that talks had stalled; publicly, the same reasons of physical format incompatibility were cited. At the end of September, Microsoft and Intel jointly announced their support for HD DVD.

Hewlett-Packard (HP) proposed an ultimatum for the Blu-ray Disc Association: adopt Microsoft's proprietary HDi (instead of the Java-based system) and a mandatory managed copy feature, or HP would support HD DVD instead. In a research report, Gartner analysts Van Baker, Laura Behrens and Mike McGuire wrote that if HP's proposal were accepted, Blu-ray would become the winner of the format war. Though the Blu-ray Disc group did add mandatory managed copy to Blu-ray, they did not add HDi.

HD DVD players and movies were released in the United States on 18 April 2006. The first Blu-ray Disc titles were released on June 20, 2006, and the first movies using dual layer Blu-ray discs (50 GB) were introduced in October 2006.

Alliances
The Blu-ray Disc Foundation was formed by Hitachi, LG, Panasonic, Pioneer, Philips, Samsung, Sharp, Sony, and Thomson on May 20, 2002. Other early supporters included Dell, HP, Mitsubishi and TDK. The Blu-ray Disc Association was inaugurated on October 4, 2004 by 14 companies of Board of Directors which added 20th Century Fox to the 13 above-mentioned companies, Contributors of 22 companies, General members of 37 companies, and a total of 73 companies.

Acer, Alpine, Asus, HP, Hitachi Maxell, Kenwood, Lanix, LG, Lite-On, Meridian, Onkyo and Samsung, provided non-exclusive support.

Toshiba, NEC, Sanyo, Memory-Tech Corporation started HD DVD Promotion Group on September 27, 2004. It also included Microsoft, RCA, Intel, Venturer Electronics. In Europe, HD DVD was supported either exclusively or non-exclusively by Medusa Home Entertainment, Studio Canal, Universum Films, Kinowelt Home Entertainment, DVD International, Opus Arte, MK2, Momentum Pictures, Twister Home Video, among others.

During the height of the format war, some studios supported both formats, including Paramount Home Entertainment, BBC Video, First Look Home Entertainment, Image Entertainment (including the Discovery Channel), Magnolia Home Entertainment, BCI Eclipse, Ryko and Koch Vision/Goldhil Entertainment.

Deciding factors
The format war's resolution in favour of Blu-ray was primarily decided by two factors: shifting business alliances, including decisions by major film studios and retail distributors, and Sony's decision to include a Blu-ray player in the PlayStation 3 video game console.

Studio, distributor alliances
Studio alliances shifted over time. Before October 2005 and the release of either format, each had the exclusive support of three of the Big Six. HD DVD had Universal Studios, Paramount Pictures, and Warner Bros. Pictures, while Blu-ray Disc started out with Sony Pictures, The Walt Disney Studios, and 20th Century Fox. Disney and Fox were both impressed by the extra DRM (BD+ and region coding) that the Blu-ray Disc format provided on paper. Then HD DVD supporters Warner Bros. and Paramount added support for Blu-ray. But in August 2007, after supporting Blu-ray for over a year, Paramount announced it would release all high-definition content (except titles directed by Steven Spielberg) exclusively on HD DVD. At the same time, DreamWorks Animation SKG, which had not released any high-definition discs, announced it would release exclusively on HD DVD. Explaining their decisions, the companies cited perceived advantages to HD DVD's technology and lower manufacturing costs. The companies together received about $150 million in cash and promotional guarantees, including a Toshiba HD DVD marketing campaign with a tie-in to Shrek the Third.

But retail support for HD DVD was eroding. In June 2007, Blockbuster, at the time the largest U.S. movie rental company, moved to Blu-ray exclusively in 1450 stores after test-marketing both formats at 250 stores and finding that more than 70% of high definition rentals were Blu-ray discs. In July 2007, Target Corporation began carrying only Blu-ray standalone players in its stores, promoting them with end cap displays featuring Blu-ray Disc movies from Sony and Disney.

On January 4, 2008, Warner Bros., which has the largest market share of DVDs, announced plans to drop HD DVD support completely as of the beginning of June 2008. At the Consumer Electronics Show in Las Vegas, some HD DVD-related events and private meetings with analysts and retailers were canceled, including an event scheduled for the eve of the show sponsored by the North American HD DVD Promotional Group.

Toshiba management expressed disappointment over Warner's decision but said that Toshiba would continue promoting the competing format. The following Monday, Toshiba reduced the price of its HD DVD players by 40 to 50 percent, calling the price a "deal breaker for the mainstream consumer". At the time, analyst Roger Kay of Endpoint Technologies Associates likened the price cut to the high-stakes blackjack bet of "doubling down" in an effort to increase market share and "win back the studios". Richard Greenfield of Pali Capital called the move a gimmick and predicted that HD DVD would not become widely adopted. Gartner analyst Hiroyuki Shimizu predicted that while the price cut might extend HD DVD's life somewhat, the limited title library would ultimately "inflict fatal damage on the format", leaving Blu-ray the victor by the end of 2008.

Warner Bros.' sister studio New Line Cinema followed suit, canceling tentative plans to release titles on HD DVD. Other small studios and producers moving exclusively to Blu-ray included National Geographic Society, Constantin Film, and Digital Playground.

Warner's move was echoed by Walmart's February 15, 2008, decision to phase HD DVD out completely by June 2008. Walmart is the largest DVD retailer in the United States, and its decision prompted the New York Times to run a mock obituary for the HD DVD format. The newspaper quoted technology analyst Rob Enderle's contention that if Walmart "says HD DVD is done, you can take that as a fact." Four days earlier, Best Buy began recommending Blu-ray Disc as the customer's digital format choice, and Netflix, the largest online video rental service, began phasing out its HD DVD inventory after stocking both formats since early 2006. In January 2008, UK retailer Woolworths Group plc said it would stock only Blu-ray discs in its 820 stores beginning in March 2008.

PlayStation 3

Sony's decision to incorporate a Blu-ray Disc player as a standard feature of the PlayStation 3 video game console also helped ensure the format's eventual triumph. By the time Toshiba ceded the market, about 10.5 million of the Sony consoles had been sold worldwide versus an estimated 1 million HD DVD players—including both standalone units and the add-on player for Microsoft's Xbox 360 console, which did not use the HD DVD add-on for gaming unlike the PS3 which had games that used the added storage capacity of Blu-ray discs. This equipment gap was a factor in Blu-ray titles (including the ones bundled with the PS3) outselling their HD DVD counterparts two to one in the United States and three or four to one in Europe.

Sony's strategy came at a cost. The company initially priced the PlayStation 3 at $599 for the 60 GB model and $499 for a 20 GB (released outside the PAL region), roughly double the price of the PlayStation 2 and substantially higher than competing consoles.  But the PS3 console sold at an estimated loss of more than US$200 per unit, resulting in losses estimated at about $3 billion.  But analysts, such as Richard Cooper with Screen Digest, expected Sony to recoup far more than that through the sale of games on the system.

AVS Forum shutdown
In November 2007, the popular audio-visual discussion site AVS Forum temporarily closed its HD-DVD and Blu-ray discussion forums because of, as the site reported, "physical threats that have involved police and possible legal action" between advocates of the rival formats.

Toshiba announcement and aftermath

On February 19, 2008, Toshiba announced it would cease developing, manufacturing and marketing HD DVD players and recorders. On that same day, Universal Studios announced it would release its titles in the Blu-ray Disc format, following two years of exclusive HD DVD support. The studio subsequently released its final two HD DVD titles: Fletch on March 11, 2008, and Atonement on March 18. On February 20, 2008, Paramount Pictures announced it would back Blu-ray, becoming the last of the major studios to do so. Paramount ceased HD DVD production on February 28, 2008, with Things We Lost in the Fire and Into the Wild becoming the studio's last HD DVD releases, both released on March 4, 2008. The studio scrapped the HD DVD version of Bee Movie, which, on May 20, 2008, joined Face/Off and Next in becoming the studio's first Blu-ray releases since becoming HD DVD exclusive. In April 2009, Warner Home Video announced it would trade up to 25 HD DVDs for the Blu-ray equivalents, charging only for shipping and handling.

Microsoft ceased production of Xbox 360 HD DVD players while considering how its HDi and VC-1 technologies could be applied to other platforms. Microsoft's VC-1 codec is already in use in Blu-ray titles; Warner Bros. encodes the main features of all titles in the format but encodes supplements and bonus content in MPEG-2. Microsoft has since entered into talks with Sony regarding Blu-ray; although, Windows Vista has supported basic filesystem and shell functionality for both Blu-ray Disc and HD DVD since launch, relying on third parties to implement movie playback. A Blu-ray drive was not released for the Xbox 360, but its successor, the Xbox One, features a built-in Blu-ray drive for movies and gaming, and the Xbox One S supports Ultra HD Blu-ray for 4K playback.

Toshiba's pullout did not have an immediate significant effect on stand-alone Blu-ray player sales, which rose 2 percent from February to March 2008, after falling 40 percent between January and February, according to NPD Group.  NPD noted that upconverting DVD player sales rose 5 percent in the first quarter of 2008 over the same quarter of 2007 but did not release a comparison of first quarter Blu-ray sales compared to the same quarter of 2007. At the time of the report, upconverting DVD players cost around $70 versus $300 for Blu-ray players. But in spring 2009, the number of Blu-ray players nearly doubled its year to date 2009 sales over the same period 2008: about 9 million high-definition units sold in the U.S. from January through March, up from the 4.8 million that sold during first-quarter 2008, according to Adams Media Research. In April 2008, the firm estimated a total of 10.5 million Blu-ray households, including Blu-ray consoles and Blu-ray-enabled PlayStation 3s.

See also
 Comparison of high-definition optical disc formats
 De facto standard
 Dominant design
 Videotape format war

References

Blu-ray Disc
HD DVD
Mass media rivalries
Optical computer storage
2000s in technology